Sophie B. Wright Charter School is a charter high school and middle school in New Orleans, Louisiana. It is a part of the Recovery School District and was named after Sophie B. Wright.

History
Sophie B. Wright Charter School opened in 2007 as part of the Recovery School District. It serves students in grades 6-12.

Beginning in 2013 James Weldon Johnson Elementary School in Carrollton temporarily served as space for Wright. In 2016 the renovations at Wright's permanent building were completed and Wright moved back in.

Athletics
Wright Charter School athletics competes in the LHSAA.

The Sophie B. Wright Warriors participate in boys basketball, football, boys track and field, girls track and field and volleyball.

References

External links

 Sophie B. Wright Charter School website

Charter schools in New Orleans
Public high schools in New Orleans
Middle schools in New Orleans
Public middle schools in Louisiana
Educational institutions established in 2007
2007 establishments in Louisiana